Route 415 is a  long mostly North–South secondary highway in the northwest portion of New Brunswick, Canada.

The route's North-Eastern terminus starts at an intersection on Route 420 in the community of Red Bank. The road travels south through the mostly treed area to the community of Warwick Settlement.  The road continues south crossing the Route 8 before ending in the community of Renous-Quarryville.

History

Intersecting routes
Route 8

See also

References

415
415